Paradaemonia is a genus of moths in the family Saturniidae first described by Eugène Louis Bouvier in 1925.

Species
The genus includes the following species:

Paradaemonia andensis (Rothschild, 1907)
Paradaemonia andina (Fassl, 1920)
Paradaemonia bahiana Brechlin & Meister, 2012
Paradaemonia balsasensis C. Mielke & Furtado, 2005
Paradaemonia berlai Oiticica Filho, 1946
Paradaemonia caligula (Girard, 1882)
Paradaemonia castanea (W. Rothschild, 1907)
Paradaemonia championi (Sonthonnax, 1904)
Paradaemonia despinayi (Bouvier, 1923)
Paradaemonia glaucescens (Walker, 1855)
Paradaemonia gravis (Jordan, 1922)
Paradaemonia guianensis Bouvier, 1925
Paradaemonia iscaybambensis Brechlin & Meister, 2013
Paradaemonia kadenii (Herrich-Schäffer, 1855)
Paradaemonia mayi (Jordan, 1922)
Paradaemonia meridionalis de Camargo, Mielke, & Casagrande, 2007
Paradaemonia nycteris (Jordan, 1922)
Paradaemonia octavus (Herrich-Schäffer, 1858)
Paradaemonia orsilochus (Maassen, 1869)
Paradaemonia platydesmia (W. Rothschild, 1907)
Paradaemonia pluto (Westwood, 1854)
Paradaemonia rufomaculata Bouvier, 1929
Paradaemonia ruschii May & Oiticica Filho, 1943
Paradaemonia samba (Schaus, 1906)
Paradaemonia siriae Brechlin, Meister & van Schayck, 2012
Paradaemonia terrena (Jordan, 1922)
Paradaemonia thelia (Jordan, 1922)
Paradaemonia vanschaycki Brechlin & Meister, 2012
Paradaemonia wagneri (Bouvier, 1924)
Paradaemonia winbrechlini Brechlin & Meister, 2012

References

Arsenurinae
Taxa named by Eugène Louis Bouvier